Al Satterfield (November 28, 1921 – October 28, 1989) was an American football tackle. He played for the San Francisco 49ers in 1947.

References

1921 births
1989 deaths
American football tackles
Vanderbilt Commodores football players
San Francisco 49ers players